The following is a list of flags used in Togo. For more information about the national flag, see flag of Togo.

National Flag

Government Flags

Togoland Protectorate

Ethnic Group Flags

Historical Flags

Proposed Flag

See also 

 Flag of Togo
 Coat of arms of Togo

References 

Lists and galleries of flags
Flags